The 2007–08 CWHL season was the first season in Canadian Women's Hockey League history. Jayna Hefford was named CWHL Most Valuable Player and a CWHL Central All-Star. She led the league with 26 goals scored in 27 games played. Jayna Hefford was voted the league's regular-season Most Valuable Player. Jennifer Botterill won the Angela James Bowl after winning the league scoring title with 61 points and was voted the CWHL Top Forward. Becky Kellar was voted the CWHL Top Defender, Kim St-Pierre was voted the CWHL Top Goaltender, and Marie-Philip Poulin was voted the CWHL Outstanding Rookie.

Final standings
Note: GP = Games played, W = Wins, L = Losses, OTL = Overtime Losses, SOL = Shootout Losses, GF = Goals for, GA = Goals against, Pts = Points.

Playoffs

First round
Burlington 2, Ottawa 1
Mississauga 6, Vaughan 2

Second round
Mississauga 4, Montreal 3
Mississauga 4, Montreal 4
Brampton 5, Burlington 2
Brampton 3, Burlington 3

CWHL championship
The Brampton Thunder won the first Championship of the CWHL. Molly Engstrom scored the game-winning goal as the Thunder beat the Mississauga Chiefs by a score of 4–3 in overtime. Lori Dupuis won the Championship Game MVP honours.

Player stats

Scoring leaders

Awards and honours

 Most Valuable Player: Jayna Hefford, Brampton
 Angela James Bowl: Top Scorer Jennifer Botterill, Mississauga
 Outstanding Rookie: Marie-Philip Poulin, Montreal
 Championship Game MVP: Lori Dupuis, Brampton

CWHL Top Players
 Top Forward: Jayna Hefford, Brampton
 Top Defender: Becky Kellar, Burlington
 Top Goaltender: Kim St-Pierre, Montreal

CWHL All-Stars
Central All-Stars
 Goaltender: Cindy Eadie, Brampton
 Defender: Becky Kellar, Burlington
 Defender: Molly Engstrom, Brampton
 Forward: Jayna Hefford, Brampton
 Forward: Jennifer Botterill, Mississauga
 Forward: Jana Harrigan, Burlington
Eastern All-Stars
 Goaltender: Kim St-Pierre, Montreal (unanimous selection)
 Defender: Nathalie Déry, Montreal
 Defender: Lyne Landry, Ottawa
 Forward: Marie-Philip Poulin, Montreal (unanimous selection)
 Forward: Leslie Oles, Montreal
 Forward: Katie Weatherston, Ottawa/Montreal

CWHL All-Rookie Team
 Goaltender: Christine Dufour, Quebec
 Defender: Molly Engstrom, Brampton
 Defender: Bobbi-Jo Slusar, Brampton
 Forward: Marie-Philip Poulin, Montreal
 Forward: Leslie Oles, Montreal
 Forward: Katie Weatherston, Ottawa/Montreal

Monthly Top Scorers
 September: Jayna Hefford, Brampton (3+8=11 points, 3 games)
 October: Marie-Philip Poulin, Montreal (12+7=19 points, 7 games)
 November: Jana Harrigan, Burlington (5+3=8 points, 5 games)
 December: Jayna Hefford, Brampton (8+9=17 points, 7 games)
 January: Jayna Hefford, Brampton (7+10=17 points, 7 games)
 February: Jennifer Botterill, Mississauga (8+10=18 points, 6 games)

References

See also
 Canadian Women's Hockey League
 2007–08 Brampton Thunder season

 
1